Events in the year 1843 in India.

Events
 Sind War.
 December – Gwalior campaign was fought between the British Empire and Marathan forces in Gwalior in India
 1 July – Bank of Madras
 Howrah district
 November 1843 – Noble College, Machilipatnam

Law
 7 April – Indian Slavery Act, 1843 was passed.
 (Colonies) Evidence Act (British statute)
Judicial Committee Act (British statute)

Deaths
 November - Esther Leach, English-Indian actress

See also

References

 
India
Years of the 19th century in India